The Maple Leaf is a schooner built in 1904, making it British Columbia's oldest tall ship. In 1906, the Maple Leaf was the only Canadian vessel to qualify for the first ever Trans-Pac sailing race, which was slated to take place in San Francisco but never took place due to the massive earthquake that occurred in that year. 

Now a sail training vessel and ecotourism schooner, she has a rich history of operation on the coast. It operates as a small cruise ship touring the west coast of North America and accommodating eight passengers.

History
In 1904, a Vancouver businessman named Alexander MacLaren wanted the fastest and best sailing yacht on the west coast. He hired Capt. William Watts, shipbuilder and founder of Vancouver Shipyard (now Vancouver Shipyards) to build it. From the 1930s to the 1970s, the Maple Leaf was a halibut longliner on the Bering Sea, making it one of the longest-running ships to fish.  It was purchased in 1980 at a government auction by Brian Falconer who restored the vessel and turned it into a eco cruise ship. Falconer sold the ship in 2001 to Kevin Smith who continued the ecotourism business.

Construction 
Originally built a yacht Maple Leaf has many features that make it a very unusual ship. The ribs are made of coastal yellow cedar wood. The planking, decks, and beams were constructed of coastal Douglas fir wood, making the ship a true vessel of the coast. Made of mahogany, the bright work of the ship was a gift from the builder's relatives. It is all the more distinctive by being the first ship North of San Francisco to have electric light. It is also one of the first ships on the coast to have an external, lead keel. The rigging of the Maple Leaf consists of a gaff rigged fore sail, a Marconi main sail, a jib, a staysail, and a square fisherman's staysail.

See also
 List of schooners

References

External links
 Official site
 Ship photos and history on the Maple Leaf official website

Schooners
Two-masted ships
1904 ships
Ships built in British Columbia
Individual sailing vessels
Tall ships